The Grand Avenue station was a station on the demolished BMT Fulton Street Line in Brooklyn, New York City. It opened on April 24, 1888, and had two tracks and two offset side platforms. It was served by trains of the BMT Fulton Street Line, and until 1920, trains of the BMT Brighton Line. The station was also the easternmost station to share the original Brighton Line trains before branching off to the south at the Franklin Avenue el station, the site of the present-day Franklin Avenue subway station. It also had connections to Putnam Avenue Line trolleys. The next stop to the east was Franklin Avenue. The next stop to the west was Vanderbilt Avenue. In 1936, the Independent Subway System built the Fulton Street subway, but provided no station as competition. The el station became obsolete, and it closed on May 31, 1940.

References

Defunct BMT Fulton Street Line stations
Railway stations in the United States opened in 1888
Railway stations closed in 1940
Former elevated and subway stations in Brooklyn